Catherine "Kitty" Piercy (born July 6, 1942) is an American politician. She was elected mayor of Eugene, Oregon in 2004, and was re-elected in 2008, and again in 2012, serving three full terms until January 2017. During the 1990s she served as Minority Leader of the Oregon House of Representatives.

Oregon State Legislature
Piercy was elected state representative in 1994, 1996, and 1998, serving from 1995–2000, for House District 39 serving West Eugene, River Road and Santa Clara. She served for the maximum three consecutive two-year terms.  She served as both assistant caucus leader and Minority Leader in 1999. She was elected assistant Democratic leader in her second term and leader in her third term.

Climate change 
Piercy has been concerned with the issues of sustainability and climate change.  Early in her first term she assembled a broad group of stakeholders into a forum called the Sustainable Business Initiative, one of whose recommendations was to create the city's Sustainability Commission, which Council officially created in 2007.

In 2005 Piercy became an early signatory of the US Mayors Climate Protection Agreement.   over 900 mayors had signed the Agreement.

Eugene issues

West Eugene EmX 
 
Piercy supported the west Eugene extension of Lane Transit District's bus rapid transit system, having voted for it in her capacity as city representative to the regional Metropolitan Planning Commission. All local jurisdictions have been proponents of the EmX system for over a decade. Two segments were completed and were successful. This mass transit system is built into all local planning documents. It is designed to be efficient and reduce carbon dioxide emissions.

Opponents to the project include citizens and business owners who say that the bus system is too expensive, is not needed, and will cause many businesses to lose business or have to close because of the construction.  Proponents include local elected bodies, Lane Transit District, community members and the Eugene Chamber of Commerce.

Proposed city tax for schools 

While Piercy was mayor, a local income tax to fund schools was proposed, but defeated.

Pledge of Allegiance controversy

While Piercy was mayor, a proposal to have Eugene council members begin saying the pledge of allegiance prior to council meetings on days of national patriotic importance was passed. Piercy said that the measure was likely to be divisive: "If there's one thing the flag stands for, it's that people don't have to be compelled to say the Pledge of Allegiance or anything else." Supporters of the measure said that objecting to it "vindicates all of us who say our Judeo-Christian heritage is under attack."

References

Peace Corps volunteers
Mayors of Eugene, Oregon
Women mayors of places in Oregon
Democratic Party members of the Oregon House of Representatives
Women state legislators in Oregon
Living people
1942 births
21st-century American politicians
21st-century American women politicians